Treforest Halt railway station was a small halt which served the village of Treforest between 1904 and 1956.

The halt had ground level platforms, with small corrugated waiting-sheds within fenced enclosures which were unlocked by conductors when a train arrived.

The station was renamed Treforest Halt in 1924. It closed in 1956. The site is now covered by the playing field of a comprehensive school.

References

Railway stations in Great Britain opened in 1904
Railway stations in Great Britain closed in 1956
Former Great Western Railway stations
Disused railway stations in Rhondda Cynon Taf